Alexander Steinbauer (born 17 November 1973) is an Austrian professional darts player who plays in Professional Darts Corporation events.

He made his PDC European Tour debut in the 2018 Austrian Darts Open, but was whitewashed 6–0 by Richie Burnett.

Steinbauer also qualified for the 2019 Austrian Darts Championship, but was beaten 6–4 by Kirk Shepherd.

References

External links

1973 births
Living people
Austrian darts players
People from Hartberg District
Sportspeople from Styria
21st-century Austrian people